The 2018 Ohio gubernatorial election took place on November 6, 2018, to elect the next governor of Ohio, concurrently with the election of Ohio's Class I U.S. Senate seat, as well as other elections to the United States Senate in other states, elections to the United States House of Representatives, and various Ohio and local elections. Incumbent Republican Governor John Kasich was term-limited and could not seek re-election for a third consecutive term.

Republicans nominated Ohio Attorney General and former U.S. Senator Mike DeWine, while Democrats nominated former Consumer Financial Protection Bureau Director and former Ohio Attorney General Richard Cordray. This was the second contest between DeWine and Cordray, following the 2010 attorney general election, which DeWine won, 47.5% to 46.3%.

In 2018, DeWine defeated Cordray 50.4% to 46.7%, in what was considered a minor upset. Despite Cordray's loss, he became the first Democratic gubernatorial candidate to win Cincinnati's Hamilton County since Dick Celeste in 1982. Likewise, DeWine became the first Republican to win in the historically Democratic Monroe County in a gubernatorial election since 2002 as the county took a sharp turn to the right. With Democratic senator Sherrod Brown winning re-election in the  same year, this was the first election since  1974 in which Ohio simultaneously voted for a governor and senator of opposite parties.

DeWine and Husted took office on January 14, 2019.

Republican primary

Candidates

Nominated
 Mike DeWine, Ohio Attorney General, former U.S. Senator, former lieutenant governor of Ohio, and  former U.S. Representative
 Running mate: Jon Husted, Ohio Secretary of State and former Speaker of the Ohio House of Representatives

Eliminated in primary
 Mary Taylor, Lieutenant Governor of Ohio
 Running mate: Nathan Estruth, businessman

Withdrew
 Jon A. Husted, Ohio Secretary of State (running for lieutenant governor)
 Jim Renacci, U.S. Representative (running for the U.S. Senate)
 Running mate: Amy Murray, Cincinnati Councilwoman

Endorsements

Polling

Results

Democratic primary

Candidates

Nominated
 Richard Cordray, former director of the Consumer Financial Protection Bureau, former Ohio Attorney General, former Ohio State Treasurer, nominee for OH-15 in 1992, nominee for Attorney General in 1998, and candidate for U.S. Senate in 2000
 Running mate: Betty Sutton, former U.S. Representative

Eliminated in primary
 Larry Ealy, former male stripper and candidate for governor in 2014
Running mate: Jeffrey Lynn
 Dennis Kucinich, former U.S. Representative, former mayor of Cleveland, candidate for Secretary of State in 1982, and candidate for President of the United States in 2004 and 2008
 Running mate: Tara Samples, Akron City Councilwoman
 Bill O'Neill, Justice of the Ohio Supreme Court and nominee for OH-14 in 2008 and 2010
 Running mate: Chantelle Lewis, elementary school principal and former East Cleveland City Councilwoman
 Paul Ray
 Running mate: Jerry Schroeder
 Joe Schiavoni, state senator and former Minority Leader of the Ohio Senate
 Running mate: Stephanie Dodd, State Board of Education Member

Failed to qualify for ballot
 Jon Heavey, physician
 Dave Kiefer, former Wayne County Commissioner and Republican candidate for state representative in 2016

Withdrew
 Connie Pillich, former state representative and nominee for Ohio State Treasurer in 2014 (endorsed Richard Cordray)
 Running mate: Scott Schertzer, Mayor of Marion, OH
 Betty Sutton, former U.S. Representative (running for lieutenant governor)
 Nan Whaley, Mayor of Dayton (endorsed Richard Cordray)

Endorsements

Polling

Results

Libertarian primary

Candidates

Nominated
 Travis Irvine, filmmaker and writer
 Running mate: Todd Grayson

Withdrew

 Bruce Jaynes, entrepreneur
 Stephen Quinn, student

Green primary

Candidates

Nominated
 Constance Gadell-Newton, attorney, co-chair of the Ohio Green Party and nominee for the State House in 2016
 Running mate: Brett R. Joseph

General election

Candidates
 Mike DeWine (Republican), Ohio Attorney General and former U.S. Senator
 Running mate: Jon A. Husted, Secretary of State of Ohio and  former Speaker of the Ohio House of Representatives
 Richard Cordray (Democratic), former director of the Consumer Financial Protection Bureau, former Ohio Attorney General and former Ohio State Treasurer
 Running mate: Betty Sutton, former U.S. Representative
 Constance Gadell-Newton (Green), attorney, co-chair of the Ohio Green Party and nominee for the State House in 2016
 Running mate: Brett R. Joseph, attorney, educator and small businessman
 Travis Irvine (Libertarian)
 Running mate: Todd Grayson, former Perrysburg City Councilman

Endorsements

Debates

Predictions

Polling

with DeWine and Kucinich

with DeWine and Pillich

with Jon Husted

with generic Republican and Democrat

Results

Notes

References

External links
 
 Candidates at Vote Smart
 Candidates at Ballotpedia

Official campaign websites
 Richard Cordray (D) for Governor
 Mike DeWine (R) for Governor
 Constance A. Gadell-Newton (G) for Governor
 Travis Irvine (L) for Governor

Gubernatorial
2018
2018 United States gubernatorial elections